Jean Balthasar Tricklir (1750 – 29 November 1813) was a French cellist and composer of German descent.

Biography 
Jean Balthasar Tricklir was born in Dijon in 1750. He originally intended to join the priesthood, but decided to become a musician and went to study in Mannheim in 1765. He made his musical debut at the concert sprituel in Paris in 1776. In 1782, Tricklir was made a chamber composer to the Elector of Mainz, but left a year later and became a court musician in Dresden. In 1783, he formed a quartet alongside Franz Benda, Ernst Schick, and an unknown called Hoffman. Tricklir died in Dresden on 29 November 1813.

Works 
Tricklir wrote a number of cello concertos and sonatas, as well as solo and duet works for cello, however, his works are little known today. He authored two theoretical treatises: Le Microcosme Musical and Discours Analytique. His theoretical studies included analysis of the role of temperature in affecting the sound of musical instruments.

Works
 Adagio and Rondo for Cello and Piano
 Six grand solos for the violoncello Op. 3
 13 cello concertos (survived)

References

External links
 Tricklir: 6 Sonatas for Cello and Piano by Fedor Amosov
 Tricklir: 4 Concertos for Cello and Orchestra by Alexander Rudin
 
 Detailed biography

1750 births
1813 deaths
French classical cellists
French Classical-period composers
Male classical composers
19th-century male musicians